Li Jinhe (Chinese: 李金河; born 22 May 1964) is a male Chinese weightlifter. He competed at the 1988 Seoul Olympics, and won a bronze medal in Men's 67.5 kg. His final score was 325 kg.

References

 Sports Reference

Chinese male weightlifters
Olympic weightlifters of China
Weightlifters at the 1988 Summer Olympics
Olympic bronze medalists for China
1964 births
Living people
Olympic medalists in weightlifting
Medalists at the 1988 Summer Olympics
20th-century Chinese people